Hasanabad-e Bam Furd (also Romanized as Ḩasanābād-e Bam Fūrd; also known as Ḩasanābād) is a village in Rizab Rural District, Qatruyeh District, Neyriz County, Fars Province, Iran. At the 2006 census, its population was 15, in 5 families.

References 

Populated places in Neyriz County